Malad Creek or Marve Creek is a creek in north-west Mumbai. Located west of Malad, the Oshiwara River drains into it. To the west is Madh Island, and to the east lies Versova. Earlier it was surrounded by a  area of mangroves. Malad creek is 5 km in length.

The Malad sewage treatment plant gives preliminary treatment of waste before discharging it directly into the creek, and in 2017 was considered "perhaps the worst" polluting plant in the city.

References 

Estuaries of Mumbai